Franz Wagner can refer to the following people:

Franz Wagner (footballer) (1911–1974), Austrian footballer
Franz Wagner (basketball) (born 2001), German basketball player